St. Mary's Church is a medieval church and National Monument in Callan, Ireland.

Location
St. Mary's is located in the centre of Callan, on the corner of Green Street and Mill Street (Augustine Street).

History
St. Mary's Church was built c. 1250 by Hugh de Mapilton, Bishop of Ossory. All but the west tower was replaced c. 1460.

A carved "Trinity Stone," depicting the Trinity, is one of only a few surviving and was sculpted by Rory O'Tunny c. 1520. It was rediscovered in 1974. A chapel was added in 1530.

The chancel continued as a Church of Ireland (Anglican) place of worship until the 1970s.

Church

The church is a nave and chancel with north and south aisles, which have four-arch arcades. The chancel and choir are roofed, and inside the choir is a square baptismal font.

There are tomb-chests in the church but no effigies: one depicts a skeleton and another vaulting and tracery.

The north doorway depicts a carved head of a woman wearing a distinctive horned headdress of the Tudor era.

References

Churches in County Kilkenny
Archaeological sites in County Kilkenny
National Monuments in County Kilkenny
Former churches in the Republic of Ireland
Callan, County Kilkenny